The Down-Kerry rivalry is a Gaelic football rivalry between Irish county teams Down and Kerry, who first played each other in 1960. It was considered to be one of the biggest rivalries in Gaelic games during the 1960s. Down's home ground is Páirc Esler and Kerry's home ground is Fitzgerald Stadium, however, all of their championship meetings have been held at neutral venues, usually Croke Park.

While Kerry have the highest number of Munster titles and Down are fifth on the roll of honour in Ulster, they have also enjoyed success in the All-Ireland Senior Football Championship, having won 42 championship titles between them to date.

All-time results

Legend

Senior

References

Kerry
Kerry county football team rivalries